Sororate marriage is a type of marriage in which a husband engages in marriage or sexual relations with the sister of his wife, usually after the death of his wife or if his wife has proven infertile. The opposite is levirate marriage.

From an anthropological standpoint, this type of marriage strengthens the ties between both groups (the wife's family or clan and the husband's) and preserves the contract between the two to provide children and continue the alliance.

The Inuit (formerly known as Eskimos) of northern Alaska, Canada and Greenland follow or followed this custom. It is followed by the Chiricahua group of the Western Apache, who are Athabaskan speaking, as is levirate marriage. 

Sororate marriage is practiced by the Sioux (Lakota) tribes, and some Western Mono tribes in California, such as the Wuksachi or Waksachi.

It was also practiced by Rachel and Leah in the Bible.

Sororate marriage is practiced by the Swazi people and for the same reasons as stated. This type of marriage is made in Bhutan. The former King Jigme Singye Wangchuck (the current king's father) is married to four wives, all of whom are sisters. There is evidence that sororate marriage existed in ancient China. 

Levirate marriage and junior sororate marriage are permitted for the Hindu Bania caste.

Judaism
Levirate marriage was encouraged among ancient Jewish cultures; the chief example of sororate marriage found in the Hebrew Bible is that of sisters Rachel and Leah to one husband Jacob, the forebear of the Twelve Tribes of Israel. However, such a marriage as Jacob's during the lifetime of the first wife was subsequently prohibited by the Law of Moses (Leviticus 18:18).

Christianity

Besides being prohibited in Roman Catholic canon law, marriage is also prohibited within close degrees of affinity by conservative Lutherans. This is on the basis of the same Bible passages noted in Judaism. Together with consanguineous relatives, close relatives by marriage are within the prohibited degrees of kinship even if not specifically outlawed by the state.

Kurds

Sororate is a custom which is practiced among the Kurds like Levirate marriage: When a man loses his wife before she bears a child or she dies leaving young children, her lineage provides another wife to the man, usually a younger sister with a lowered bride-price. Both Levirate and Sororate are practiced to guarantee the well-being of children and ensure that any inheritance of land will stay within the family.

See also
Deceased Wife's Sister's Marriage Act 1907

References

Customs involving siblings
Remarriage